Stanley Francois (8 April 1899 – 20 July 1955) was a South African cricketer. He played in five first-class matches for Border in 1923/24.

See also
 List of Border representative cricketers

References

External links
 

1899 births
1955 deaths
South African cricketers
Border cricketers